Kim Seok-woo (born August 7, 1996), better known by his stage name Rowoon, is a South Korean singer, actor and model. He is a member of the K-pop boy band SF9 as a lead vocalist. As an actor, he is known for his roles in television series Extraordinary You (2019), She Would Never Know (2021), The King's Affection (2021), and Tomorrow (2022).

Career

2013–2014: Pre-debut 
He was introduced as a trainee in FNC Entertainment's reality show Cheongdam-dong 111.

2015–2016: Debut with SF9 

In 2015, he was a part of pre-debut team, “Neoz School”, under FNC Entertainment as a member of the group called NEOZ. In May 2016, he participated as a member of "NEOZ Dance" in FNC Entertainment's survival show d.o.b (Dance or Band), competing against NEOZ Band (later known as Honeyst). "NEOZ Dance" won the competition with 51% of the votes and received the opportunity to debut. He debuted with group SF9 in October 2016 with the single "Fanfare".

2017–present: Solo activities, rising popularity 
His acting career in television series began with KBS2's School 2017 with a minor supporting role. After his appearance, he steadily began receiving bigger roles. In March 2018, he was confirmed to star in tvN's About Time as the female lead's brother. In July 2018, he was confirmed to star in SBS’s Where Stars Land in which he was nominated for the New Actor award.

On May 9, 2019, Rowoon was confirmed to be the male lead in MBC's school fantasy drama, Extraordinary You based on the hit Daum webtoon July Found by Chance. After receiving the role of Haru, Rowoon’s popularity skyrocketed, launching him into stardom. He was nominated at the MBC Drama Awards with fellow costars, Kim Hyeyoon and Lee Jaewook, for Best Couple, and was awarded with Best New Actor. On May 10, 2019, Rowoon was featured in NC.A's music video, "밤바람" (Awesome Breeze).

In January 2020, Rowoon was selected as the new model for makeup brand KLAVUU. In April, it was revealed that he would be the voice of Branch in the Korean dub of the animated movie Trolls World Tour. Later that month, Rowoon was selected as the new brand ambassador for Gong Cha Korea. On May 25, 2020, FNC Entertainment confirmed that Rowoon will star in upcoming JTBC drama She Would Never Know, based on the webtoon of the same name. The drama began airing in January 2021. On August 18, 2020, it was announced that Rowoon was selected as the new brand ambassador for The North Face White Label 2020 Fall/Winter collection. 

In 2021, Rowoon starred as the male lead in the historical drama The King's Affection which premiered in October 2021. On July 1, 2021, Rowoon was selected as the new model for cosmetic brand Estée Lauder. In late 2021, Rowoon became an MC for KBS Song Festival along with ASTRO's Cha Eun-woo and Kim Seol-hyun.

In 2022, Rowoon starred in the MBC fantasy drama Tomorrow.

Discography

Singles

Filmography

Films

Television series

Television shows

Hosting

Awards and nominations

Listicles

Notes

References

External links 

 
 
 

1996 births
Living people
SF9 (band) members
FNC Entertainment artists
21st-century South Korean male actors
South Korean male actors
South Korean male television actors
Male actors from Seoul
21st-century South Korean male  singers
South Korean male idols
K-pop singers